Lolium remotum is a species of grass in the family Poaceae.

Its native range is Pakistan to Western Himalaya.

References

Pooideae